Maja Petrin (3 July 1972 – 4 March 2014) was a Croatian actress.

Death 
Maja Petrin was born in Zagreb, and died suddenly at her home in Zagreb from heart failure on 4 March 2014, aged 41.

Filmography

Television roles 
 Stipe u gostima as Ivona (2012)
 Pod sretnom zvijezdom as Biba (2011)
 Zakon ljubavi as Korina Lovrić (2008)
 Zabranjena ljubav as Dunja Barišić (2006-2008)
 Hitna 94 as Sonja Šimić (2008)
 Ponos Ratkajevih as Irina Aleksandar (2007)
 Villa Maria as Zora Rački (2004-2005)
 Obiteljska stvar as Sanja (1998)

References

External links

1972 births
2014 deaths
Actresses from Zagreb
Croatian television actresses
Croatian stage actresses
21st-century Croatian actresses
20th-century Croatian actresses
Burials at Miroševac Cemetery